Speed was an Australian satellite and cable television sports network dedicated to motorsport.  The network was owned by Fox Sports Pty Limited and launched on 1 November 2010.  It is a sister of the now defunct US channel of the same name, although it is no longer corporately connected due to the split of News Corporation, as Fox Sports Australia is included in News Corp and not 21st Century Fox.

On 2 November 2014, Speed closed and was replaced by Fox Sports 5.

History 

Speed launched in Australia on 1 November 2010 on Foxtel in both standard and high definition. After months of negotiations and controversy, on 25 March 2011, Speed and Speed HD launched on Austar (the regional Australia subscription television provider).

Content 

The following is the list of sports programming which was shown on Speed.

Open wheel 

 IndyCar Series
 FIA Formula 2 Championship
 FIA Formula 3 Championship
 Indy Lights
 Auto GP
 Toyota Racing Series

NASCAR 

 NASCAR Sprint Cup
 NASCAR Nationwide Series
 NASCAR Camping World Cup Series

Touring Cars 

 Virgin Australia Supercars Championship
 NZ V8 SuperTourers
 World Touring Car Championship
 British Touring Car Championship
 DTM
 European Touring Car Championship
 Shannons Nationals Motor Racing Championships
 Superstars International Series
 Summernats

Sportscars 

 Le Mans 24 Hours
 Rolex GRAND-AM Sportscar Series
 American Le Mans Series
 Australian GT Championship
 Bathurst 12 Hour
 Continental Tire Series
 Dubai 24 Hour
 FIA European Truck Racing Championship
 24 Hours Nürburgring
 Shannons Nationals Motor Racing Championships
 FIA World Endurance Championship

Drag racing 

 ANDRA Pro Series

Bikes 

 MotoGP  
 World Superbike Championship
 World Supersport Championship
 FIM Superstock 1000 Cup
 UEM European Superstock 600 Championship
 British Superbike Championship
 Australian Superbike Championship
 Australian FX Superbike Championship
 FIM Endurance World Championship
 Irish Road Racing Series
 FIM Sidecar World Championship

Rally 

 World Rally Championship
 Australian Rally Championship
 Asia-Pacific Rally Championship
 Australasian Safari
 British Rally Championship
 European Rally Championship
 European Rallycross Championship
 Targa Tasmania
 Targa West

Speedway 

 FIM Speedway Grand Prix
 FIM Speedway World Cup
 British Elite Speedway
 World Series Sprintcars
 Australian Sprintcar Championship
 Chequered Flag
 FIM Ice Speedway World Championship
 Grand Annual Sprintcar Classic
 World of Speedway

Motocross 

 AMA Motocross Championship
 Australian Supercross Championship
 British Motocross Championship
 FIM Enduro World Championship
 FIM Motocross World Championship
 FIM MX of Nations
 FIM Supermoto
 MXTV

Magazines 

 Autospeed
 Battle of the Supercars
 The Car Show
 Car Warriors
 Dumbest Stuff on Wheels
 GP Racing
 Motorsport Mundial
 My Ride Rules
 SPEED Center
 Speedmakers

References 

2010 establishments in Australia
2014 disestablishments in Australia
Defunct television channels in Australia
English-language television stations in Australia
Fox Sports (Australian TV network)
Sports television networks in Australia
Television channels and stations disestablished in 2014
Television channels and stations established in 2010
Television channels and networks about cars